Jack Michael (January 16, 1926 – November 12, 2020) was an American psychologist and professor at Western Michigan University. He developed one of the first token economies, the concept of motivating operations (MOs), and is a pioneer of what is now referred to as applied behavior analysis (ABA, also called behavioral engineering).

Early life
Michael, named John Lester Michael, was born on January 16, 1926, in Los Angeles, California. He had no siblings. His father Lester Lioniel was an automobile mechanic and his mother Willie did not work outside of the home. He lived in a lower-middle-class neighborhood near downtown L.A. from the time he was 5 years old until he was drafted into the army at 18.

As a youth, he joined an inner city Hispanic gang but avoided fights, protected by members who needed his help with their own schoolwork. He developed an early love of reading, accompanying his mother to the library on Saturdays.

He attended elementary school from 1931 to 1937, Junior High School from 1938 to 1940, and High School from 1941 to 1943. He was in the Boy Scouts for about 3 years, took drum lessons, and played in a youth orchestra/marching band.

Career
Michael entered UCLA as a chemistry major in Fall 1943, completed one semester, then was drafted into the army in June 1944 (in the middle of his second semester). Although he was a very good student in high school, he was an average student at UCLA, earning a C-average his first year.

He was professor emeritus of psychology at Western Michigan University. He began teaching at WMU in 1967 and retired from the university in April 2003, teaching for a total of 36 years at WMU. He was married to Alyce Dickinson, former chairman of the I/O department at Western Michigan University.

Publications
Michael has published over 70 articles and 1 book, Concepts and Principles of Behavior Analysis. As a professor at the University of Houston, he and his colleague Teodoro Ayllon conducted the well-known study The psychiatric nurse as a behavioral engineer (1959) in the Journal of the Experimental Analysis of Behavior (JEAB) where a token economy was employed for hospitalized patients with schizophrenia and intellectual disability. This helped to set what was then known as behavior modification in motion, and in turn, led to the establishment of the discipline of applied behavior analysis when researchers at the University of Kansas started the Journal of Applied Behavior Analysis (JABA) in 1968.

He was also the past editor of The Analysis of Verbal Behavior (TAVB), which publishes theoretical and experimental work related to extensions of Skinner's analysis of Verbal Behavior.

References

21st-century American psychologists
Behaviourist psychologists
2020 deaths
1926 births
Western Michigan University faculty